This is a list of montes (mountains, singular mons) on the planet Venus. Venusian mountains are all named after goddesses in the mythologies of various cultures, except for the Maxwell Montes.

The four main mountain ranges of Venus are named Akna Montes, Danu Montes, Freyja Montes, and Maxwell Montes. These are found on Ishtar Terra.

Mountain ranges are formed by the folding and buckling of a planet's crust. The mountain ranges of Venus, like those of the Earth, are characterized by many parallel folds and faults.

The presence of mountain ranges on Venus may provide evidence that the planet's surface is in motion.

Montes 

Key
DIAM	— Longest dimension of feature in kilometres
AS	— Approval status
(1)	— Adopted by the International Astronomical Union (IAU) General Assembly
(2)	— Working Group for Planetary System Nomenclature (WGPSN) approval
(3)	— Dropped, no longer in use

See also
 List of coronae on Venus
 List of craters on Venus
 List of tallest mountains in the Solar System
 List of mountains on Mars by height

References

External links
 List of named mountains on Venus
 BBC: Venus has 'heavy metal mountains'

Venus
Surface features of Venus
 
Venus-related lists